Yankee (also known as Machigonne) is an early-20th-century steel hulled ferry which is registered as a historic vessel with the National Register of Historic Places. As of 2006 it was berthed in Hoboken, New Jersey. In mid-2013, the ferry was moved to the Henry Street pier in the Gowanus Bay Terminal in Red Hook, Brooklyn.

Operational history
Described as unusually luxurious for a day-voyaging vessel, Yankee  was built in 1907 by the Philadelphian shipbuilding company Neafie & Levy for the Casco Bay and Harpswell Line. There is some confusion about her original name, with some sources listing it as Dida. It is unclear however, if the ship ever operated under that name, since she is commonly referred to as Machigonne from an early point in her career.

Machigonne began her service life ferrying passengers between Portland, Maine and the Calendar Islands in Casco Bay. In 1913, she was sold to the Nahant Steamship Line of Boston, Massachusetts, and used on the Boston, Nahant and Pines Island route.

Following America's entry into World War I, Machigonne was acquired by the United States Navy on 2 October 1917 under charter, and commissioned 15 May 1918 as USS Machigonne (SP-1043). During the war, the ship was armed with two one-pounder guns for defense, and used to transport men and supplies between Boston and Bumpkin Island Training Station.

After the end of hostilities, USS Machigonne was decommissioned and resumed commercial service. In 1921, the ship was purchased by John E. Moore and transferred to New York Harbor. For the next eight years, Machigonne was used to ferry newly arriving immigrants from their incoming ships to Ellis Island, and thenceforth to the mainland. These immigrants, many of whom were kept below decks on their transatlantic voyage, are said to have obtained their first views of New York City from the decks of Machigonne. In this period, the ship was also used to ferry tourists to the Statue of Liberty.

In 1929, the ship was sold to a Captain Daniel F. McAllister, and renamed Hook Mountain. For the next ten years she operated as a tour boat, carrying passengers from Battery Park to Bedloe's Island and Governors Island. Hook Mountain was sold to a Rhode Island company in 1939, and renamed Block Island. She also operated under the name League Island when requisitioned for World War II service. In 1947, the vessel had her original steam propulsion replaced with a 900 Hp GM diesel from a LST, was renamed Yankee and used to transport vacationers from Providence to Block Island, a task that apparently continued for several decades. The vessel was finally retired from commercial service after the 1983 summer season which included a charter to the America's Cup Races off of Newport, RI.  It was then laid up in Montville, CT for several years.  It was later towed to Providence, RI and docked very close to where she used to depart from for Block Island service and was neglected and became a target for vandals.

Restoration
In 1990, the by-now dilapidated Yankee was bought by a private citizen, Jim Gallagher, who towed it to Pier 25, Tribeca, Manhattan, where he began working on its restoration. In an unusual arrangement, Gallagher was permitted by the local authorities to live on the boat in order to continue with his work. To help pay for the job, Gallagher rented the boat out to weddings and parties. The vessel was added to the National Register of Historic Places in 1992.

In 2003, Gallagher sold the boat to new owners who pledged to continue with the restoration work. In 2006 the boat was moved to Hoboken, New Jersey while the local council carried out an upgrade to Pier 25. Although operational, the boat is apparently not used for actual voyages since it lacks a seaworthiness certificate.

Yankee is one of several vessels built by Neafie & Levy to be either still operational or operating until very recently. Another Neafie & Levy vessel that is still operational is the tugboat Jupiter. A third vessel, the tugboat Tuff-E-Nuff (originally the Thomas Cunningham Sr.), built in 1895, was remarkably still in commercial service in its original role as of May 2007.

In 2003 Yankee was bought by Richard and Victoria MacKenzie-Childs, and moved to a dock in Red Hook, Brooklyn in 2013. While interior repair and restoration work is ongoing, the ship is in need of drydock space/funding to have its hull inspected, repaired, and deemed seaworthy again.

In 2018, while in drydock in Staten Island after further hull work, the Yankee was listed for sale by Franklin-Ruttan: "The oldest existing Ellis Island Ferry. Built in 1907, acquired by Victoria & Richard Mackenzie-Childs in 2003 and renovated with their creative touch. 150 foot historic vessel listed on National Register of historic places. Currently configured as residence with 11 bedrooms. Potential as public exhibit, Event Venue / Restaurant. "Either afloat upon the waters, OR mounted upon the land, or cresting a building like an elegant. Crown! A most intriguing vista from without and from within. Ship has undergone hull restoration in 2017. $2.37M."

Footnotes and references

External links

 Video tour of the Yankee.
 Photo gallery at Navsource.org
 Photo gallery at Naval Historical
Center
 Hoboken 411 in 2008

Ferries of Maine
Ferries of Massachusetts
Ferries of New York City
Ferries of Rhode Island
Ships built by Neafie and Levy
World War I auxiliary ships of the United States
Ships on the National Register of Historic Places in Manhattan
1907 ships
Transportation in Boston
Hoboken, New Jersey
National Register of Historic Places in Hudson County, New Jersey